Dowlatabad (also Romanized as Dowlatābād; also known as Daulatābād) is a village in Baghin Rural District, in the Central District of Kerman County, Kerman Province, Iran. At the 2006 census, its population was 65, in 14 families.

References 

Populated places in Kerman County